Beverly Todd (born July 11, 1946) is an American actress, producer and writer. She is known for her roles in films Brother John (1971), Moving (1988), Lean on Me (1989) and The Bucket List (2007).

On television, Todd appeared in the short lived Julie Farr, M.D. (1978−79) and The Redd Foxx Show (1986). She recurred on Six Feet Under (2002−03) and has appeared in several soap operas, including Love of Life (1968−70) and Days of Our Lives (2012). Todd has portrayed Beatrice Carter on 9-1-1 on a recurring basis since 2019. Todd has received four NAACP Image Award nominations throughout her career.

Early life
Todd was born in Chicago, Illinois, the daughter of Virena Todd. Todd aspired to be an actress from childhood, and performed in school plays.

Career
She began her acting career in the Off-Broadway production of Deep Are the Roots, and later performed in the London productions of No Strings (replacing Barbara McNair) and Blues for Mr. Charlie.

Todd played the main role in the Broadway comedy play Carry Me Back to Morningside Heights directed by Sidney Poitier. She later appeared opposite Poitier in four films. In her film debut, The Lost Man (1969), she appeared as beautician Sally, who uses the assumed name of Dorothy Starr. This was followed by roles in Poitier's They Call Me Mister Tibbs! (1970), Brother John (1971) and A Piece of the Action (1977). In Brother John, Todd was a school teacher named Louisa. A reviewer stated Todd had "natural charm" in the role. She considered Poitier to be her acting mentor. 

On television, she was a regular cast member on the daytime soap opera, Love of Life, from 1968 to 1970. She portrayed Monica Nelson, a theater actress who becomes involved with Lincoln Kilpatrick's character. In 1977, she appeared in the educational show The Write Channel on PBS. Todd received an NAACP Image Award nomination for her performance in the critically acclaimed PBS production of Six Characters in Search of an Author (1976). She received her second NAACP Image Award nomination for her role as an adult Fanta in the ABC miniseries, Roots. In the late 1970s, Todd appeared regularly as Kelly Williams in Julie Farr, M.D.. Todd appeared in the Barnaby Jones episode titled, “The Bounty Hunter” (12/16/1976).

She appeared as Dana in The Ghost of Flight 401 (1978) and played the role of Lahoma, the wife of Satchel Paige, in the 1981 television film Don't Look Back: The Story of Leroy 'Satchel' Paige. In 1986, Todd was cast as the ex-wife of Redd Foxx's character on The Redd Foxx Show; the series had performed poorly in viewership and was overhauled with the addition of Todd and comedian Sinbad to the cast. The measure failed to improve ratings, and the show was canceled after one season.

Todd played the wife of Richard Pryor's character in Moving (1988), which garnered her another NAACP Image Award nomination. She portrayed high school vice principal Joan Levias in Lean on Me (1989) with Morgan Freeman. A film critic believed Todd was "wonderful" in Lean on Me. She received her fourth NAACP Image Award nomination for her performance in the film. Around this time, Todd also acted in the Whoopi Goldberg film Clara's Heart. Todd made appearances on various television series during the 1980s, including Lou Grant, St. Elsewhere, Cagney & Lacey, and Magnum, P.I..

She did not appear regularly on the screen during the 1990s, only appearing intermittently in A Different World and other series in guest spots. She returned to acting in 2002, with a recurring role in the HBO series, Six Feet Under as Mrs. Charles. In 2004, she appeared as Don Cheadle's character's drug addict mother in the critically acclaimed film, Crash. She reunited with Morgan Freeman in the 2007 comedy-drama film, The Bucket List. In the film, Todd portrayed his wife Virginia. Freeman recommended Todd to the film's director, Rob Reiner. 

Todd also had supporting roles in the independent films The Lena Baker Story (2008) and I Will Follow (2011), playing Amanda, the deceased aunt of Salli Richardson's character. Roger Ebert was favorable of Todd's performance in this film. Todd also guest starred on House, The Closer and Grey's Anatomy, and, in 2012, had the recurring role in the NBC daytime soap opera, Days of Our Lives as Celeste Perrault, the mother of Lexie Carver (Renée Jones). As of 2019, Todd had a recurring role as Beatrice on 9-1-1.

Personal life
She was married to film producer-director Kris Keiser. Their son, Malik Smith, died on March 20, 1989 at age 18 after being severely beaten at a teen youth center (no alcohol served or allowed) while on spring break in Utah. Smith's killer was found guilty of negligent homicide and received a one year prison sentence, only serving eight months. Todd was not satisfied with the jury's decision, and sought to have homicide laws in Utah be stricter.

Todd is a co-founder of the Sunshine Circle preschool, which follows a Montessori curriculum.

Filmography

Film
 1969 The Lost Man as Sally Carter
 1969 Some Kind of a Nut as Policewoman (uncredited)
 1970 They Call Me Mister Tibbs! as "Puff"
 1971 Brother John as Louisa MacGill
 1977 A Piece of the Action
 1982 Vice Squad as Detective Louise Williams
 1982 Homework as Clinic Receptionist
 1986 The Ladies Club as Georgiane
 1987 Happy Hour as Laura
 1987 Baby Boom as Ann Bowen
 1988 Moving as Monica Pear
 1988 Clara's Heart as Dora
 1989 Lean on Me as Mrs. Joan Levias
 1995 Exquisite Tenderness as Nurse Burns
 2004 Crash as Mrs. Waters, Graham's Mother
 2005 Animal as Latreese
 2007 Ascension Day as Nancy
 2007 The Bucket List as Virginia Chambers
 2008 The Lena Baker Story as Annie Baker
 2011 I Will Follow as Amanda
 2018 Drive Me to Vegas and Mars as Maggie
 2019 Turnover as Ruth
 2020 A Dark Foe as Mildred
 2020 Broken as Grandma Wright

Television 
 1968-1970 Love of Life as Monica Nelson
 1969 The Wild Wild West as Angelique
 1976 Six Characters in Search of an Author (TV Movie) as The Stepdaughter
1976  Barnaby Jones as Donna G Sanders The Bounty Hunter
 1977 The Write Channel as Red Green
 1977 Roots
 1978 The Ghost of Flight 401 (TV Movie) as Dana
 1978 Having Babies III (TV Movie) as Kelly Williams
 1978-1979 Having Babies as Kelly
 1979 The Jericho Mile (TV Movie) as Wylene
 1979-1980 Benson as Casey Turner / Senator Francine Wade
 1980 Lou Grant as Gloria
 1981 Quincy M.E. as Gretchen Davis
 1981 Don't Look Back: The Story of Leroy 'Satchel' Paige (TV Movie) as Lahoma Brown
 1981 Please Don't Hit Me, Mom (TV Movie) as Louise Hawley
 1984 St. Elsewhere as Corrine Close
 1984 A Touch of Scandal (TV Movie) as Beatty
 1985 Magnum, P.I. as Donna Clemens
 1985 Fraud Squad (TV Short)
 1986 The Redd Foxx Show as Felicia Clemmons-Hughes
 1987 A Different Affair (TV Movie) as Marla
 1987 Hill Street Blues as Mrs. Milton
 1991 A Different World as Julia Reeves
 2002-2003 Six Feet Under as Lucille Charles / Keith's Mother
 2006 Ghost Whisperer as Sheri Powell
 2007 House M.D as Alicia Foreman
 2007 The Closer as Mrs. Richards
 2010 Criminal Minds as Susan Anderson
 2011 Taken from Me: The Tiffany Rubin Story (TV Movie) as Belzora
 2011 Grey's Anatomy as Gilda Ruiz
 2012 Days of Our Lives as Celeste Perrault
 2013 Royal Pains as Bea
 2017 Queen Sugar as Mother Olivia Brown
 2019 9-1-1 as Beatrice Carter

References
 Demetria Fulton previewed Todd’s appearance in Barnaby Jones; episode titled, “The Bounty Hunter”(12/16/1976).

External links

1946 births
Actresses from Chicago
African-American actresses
American film actresses
Screenwriters from Illinois
American television actresses
Television producers from Illinois
American women television producers
Living people
American women screenwriters
20th-century American actresses
21st-century American actresses
20th-century African-American women
20th-century African-American people
21st-century African-American women
21st-century African-American people